Acoma may refer to:

 Acoma (beetle), a scarab beetle genus of subfamily Melolonthinae
 Acoma Pueblo, a Native American pueblo
 Acoma, Nevada, a ghost town
 Acoma Township, McLeod County, Minnesota, US
 , more than one ship of the US Navy
 Acoma Party, a former political party in Indonesia
 ACOMA, a defunct French automobile maker

See also
 Coma (disambiguation)